Deniau is a French surname. Notable people with the surname include:

François Joseph Pierre Deniau (1936–2014), French Roman Catholic bishop
Jean-François Deniau (1928–2007), French diplomat and writer

See also
Deniau Island, island of Graham Land, Antarctica

French-language surnames